Lebedenko is a surname of Ukrainian origin that may refer to:

Igor Lebedenko (born 1983), Russian footballer
Nikita Lebedenko, Soviet general
Nikolay Lebedenko, 20th century Russian military engineer
Oleksandr Lebedenko (born 1989), Ukrainian footballer
Orest Lebedenko (born 1998), Ukrainian footballer
Yelena Lebedenko (born 1971), Russian heptathlete

See also
Lebedenco, a commune in Moldova
Lebedenko tank

Russian-language surnames
Ukrainian-language surnames